The Chinese Top Ten Music Awards is a music awards founded by Shanghai Media Group and broadcast on Dragon Television in 1993 to honor the artists and works in the Mandopop music industry.

History  
Formerly known as ERS Chinese Top Ten, the award show was originated from the same title radio program created in 1992. ERS(East Radio Station) represents in Chinese as 东方广播电台 which was named by then Chinese Communist Party general secretary Jiang Zemin.

Ceremonies

Categories 
 Best Album
 Best Male Singer
 Best Female Singer
 Most Popular Male Singer
 Most Popular Female Singer
 Best Lyrics
 Best Composition
 Most Influential Concert
 Best Singer-Songwriter
 Best New Artist
 Best Pop Collaboration
 Best Adapted Song
 Best Duet
 Best Film Original Song
 Best Crossover Artist
 Most Improved Artist
 Most Stylish Artist
 Most Breakthrough Artist
 Best Concept Album
 Media Recommend Singer
 Media Recommend Group 
 Media Recommend Singer-Songwriter
 Media Recommend Album
 Most Popular Singer (Hong Kong)
 Most Popular Singer (Taiwan)
 Most Popular Singer (Singapore)
 Most Popular Singer (Malaysia)
 Best Asian Singer-Songwriter
 Most Outstanding Asian Band
 Most Popular Asian Singer
 Most Earthshaking Asian Singer
 Earthshaking Achievement Award
 Song of the Year
 Album of the Year
 Internet Influential Award
 People's Choice Male Singer
 People's Choice Female Singer
 People's Choice Group
 Top 10 Songs of the Year

References

External links 
 Official website

1993 establishments in China
Annual events in China
Awards established in 1993
Chinese music awards
Recurring events established in 1993